Hadrut Province was a province of the Republic of Artsakh. The provincial capital was Hadrut city. The last governor was Valery Gevorkian. The province was captured by the armed forces of the Republic of Azerbaijan during the 2020 Nagorno-Karabakh war.

It consisted of most of the Jabrayil District, the western part of the Fuzuli District as well as the southwestern part of the Khojavend District.

History 
More than 340 people of Hadrut Region fell victim during the First Nagorno-Karabakh War.

During the 2020 Nagorno-Karabakh conflict, heavy fighting took place in and around the city of Hadrut. Independent sources confirmed that the Azerbaijani army took control of the city of Hadrut on either 14 or 15 October 2020. Following the Aras Valley campaign and the Battle of Shusha, all of Hadrut Province was captured by the Azerbaijan Army by 9 November 2020. A peacekeeping contingent of the Russian Federation was placed along the frontline.

Geography 
Hadrut Province formed the breakaway Republic of Artsakh's southern border and is one of its most mountainous parts. Villages were primarily found along two river valleys and scattered in lower elevations on the very southern fringe. Excavations of the Azokh Cave showed that humans have inhabited this area for tens of thousands of years, and the region has a rich history.

Hadrut province had 30 communities of which one was considered urban and 29 were rural. The most important problems were drinking and irrigation water, and internal communication roads. Some villages were lacking a telephone network and some had difficulties with watching Armenian TV channels. Nearly 30% of its area has been ruined and burnt several times.

Settlements 

 Aknaghbyur
 Arajamugh
 Arakel
 Arpagetik
 Arevshat
 Aygestan
 Azykh
 Banadzor
 Jrakus
 Drakhtik
 Dzoragyugh
 Hadrut (capital)
 Hakaku
 Hartashen
 Hin Tagher
 Hogher
 Ijevanatun

 Jraberd
 Jrakan
 Karaglukh
 Karmrakuch
 Khalynbulakh
 Khandzadzor
 Khtsaberd
 Kovshat
 Kyuratagh
 Mariamadzor
 Melikashen
 Mets Tagher
 Mokhrenes
 Norashen
 Petrosashen
 Pletants

 Saralanj
 Sarinshen
 Spitakashen
 Taghaser
 Taghut
 Togh
 Tumi
 Tsaghkavank
 Tsakuri
 Tsamdzor
 Tsor
 Tyak
 Ukhtadzor
 Vank
 Varanda
 Vardashat

Sites of interest 

 Monastery of Spitak Khatch (Սպիտակ Խաչ; White Cross), 14th century
 Gtichavank monastery (Գտիչի վանք), 1241–1248
 Anapat Church (Անապատ եկեղեցի), 13th century, near the village of Togh (Տող)
 Khodaafarin Bridges

See also 
 Dizak
 Arajamugh

References

External links 
 Armeniapedia – Rediscovering Armenia – Hadrut Region

Regions of the Republic of Artsakh
Hadrut (province)
States and territories disestablished in 2020